Iron Mountain is a city in the U.S. state of Michigan. The population was 7,518 at the 2020 census, down from 7,624 at the 2010 census. It is the county seat of Dickinson County. in the state's Upper Peninsula. Iron Mountain was named for the valuable iron ore found in the vicinity.

Iron Mountain is the principal city of the Iron Mountain, MI-WI Micropolitan Statistical Area, which includes all of Dickinson County, Michigan and Florence County in Wisconsin.

Iron Mountain hosts a few points of interest such as the Millie Hill bat cave, The Cornish Pump, and is located adjacent to Pine Mountain ski jump/ski resort, one of the largest artificial ski jumps in the world. It shares Woodward Avenue with the neighboring town, Kingsford. In addition, Iron Mountain is known for its pasties, Bocce Ball Tournaments, World Cup Ski Jumps, and Italian cuisine. Iron Mountain was also named a "Michigan Main Street" community by Michigan Governor Jennifer Granholm in 2006. It is one of only thirteen such communities in the State of Michigan in 2008. It is also the hometown of Michigan State University men's basketball coach Tom Izzo and former NFL head coach Steve Mariucci.

Geography

Transportation

Bus service

Indian Trails provides daily intercity bus service between St. Ignace and Ironwood, Michigan.

Major highways

 runs east to Escanaba and west to Ironwood.
 merges with US 2 just east of the city and heads northward toward Crystal Falls; southbound it continues on to Green Bay, Wisconsin.

Airport

The Iron Mountain area is served by Ford Airport (airport code: KIMT). Commercial air travel is provided by SkyWest Airlines, providing jet service as Delta Connection. Located three miles west of the city, the airport handles approximately 7,600 operations per year, with roughly 27% commercial service, 57% air taxi and 16% general aviation. The airport has a 6,501 foot asphalt runway with approved ILS, GPS and NDB approaches (Runway 1-19) and a 3,808 foot asphalt crosswind runway (Runway 13-31).

Train
Soon after this area was settled the news of mineral riches brought the railroads. First was Milwaukee Road, Then Chicago & Northwestern and Wisconsin and Michigan. The W&M Railroad, after its abandonment was approved ended all service in 1938.

The thriving of automobile usage in the 1950s caused the rail passenger usage to wain, and the Milwaukee Road discontinued the Chippewa passenger train altogether on February 2, 1960. With few riders remaining, the Copper Country Limited made its last runs on March 7, 1968. The C&NW also discontinued its service to Iron Mountain in the early 1960s.

Although there is currently no direct rail passenger service to Iron Mountain, Amtrak Thruway Bus Service connects to Marinette, Wisconsin.

Demographics

2010 census
As of the census of 2010, there were 7,624 people, 3,362 households, and 2,025 families residing in the city. The racial makeup of the city was 96.3% White, 0.5% African American, 0.6% Native American, 0.7% Asian, 0.3% from other races, and 1.7% from two or more races. Hispanic or Latino of any race were 1.6% of the population.

There were 3,362 households, of which 28.0% had children under the age of 18 living with them, 44.3% were married couples living together, 11.0% had a female householder with no husband present, 4.8% had a male householder with no wife present, and 39.8% were non-families. 34.2% of all households were made up of individuals, and 13.4% had someone living alone who was 65 years of age or older. The average household size was 2.21 and the average family size was 2.83.

The median age in the city was 42.4 years. 22.6% of residents were under the age of 18; 8% were between the ages of 18 and 24; 22.9% were from 25 to 44; 29.3% were from 45 to 64; and 17.2% were 65 years of age or older. The gender makeup of the city was 49.2% male and 50.8% female.

2000 census
As of the census of 2000, there were 8,154 people, 3,458 households, and 2,147 families residing in the city. The racial makeup of the city was 97.67% White, 0.20% African American, 0.48% Native American, 0.66% Asian, 0.01% Pacific Islander, 0.23% from other races, and 0.75% from two or more races. Hispanic or Latino of any race were 1.07% of the population. 20.6% were of Italian, 14.0% German, 9.0% Swedish, 8.8% English, 8.8% French, 5.8% Finnish and 5.5% Irish ancestry according to Census 2000. 97.2% spoke English and 1.4% Italian as their first language.

There were 3,458 households, out of which 30.0% had children under the age of 18 living with them, 48.8% were married couples living together, 9.6% had a female householder with no husband present, and 37.9% were non-families. 33.3% of all households were made up of individuals, and 16.2% had someone living alone who was 65 years of age or older. The average household size was 2.29 and the average family size was 2.94.

In the city, the population was spread out, with 25.1% under the age of 18, 7.1% from 18 to 24, 27.2% from 25 to 44, 21.1% from 45 to 64, and 19.6% who were 65 years of age or older. The median age was 39 years. For every 100 females, there were 96.4 males. For every 100 females age 18 and over, there were 90.6 males.

The median income for a household in the city was $32,526, and the median income for a family was $43,687. Males had a median income of $38,309 versus $22,533 for females. The per capita income for the city was $19,918. About 9.4% of families and 10.6% of the population were below the poverty line, including 13.5% of those under age 18 and 10.5% of those age 65 or over.

Media

Newspaper
The newspaper of record in Dickinson County is The Daily News.

Television

Iron Mountain is included in the Marquette television market, NBC affiliate WLUC operates a local news bureau covering the city and neighboring areas. Due to distance from the transmitters and topography in the region terrestrial television signals are very limited in the area with the strongest signal coming from Wisconsin Public Television translator station W30DZ originating from Fence, WI.

Historically Iron Mountain was served by full power station WDHS which intermittently carried a religious format between long periods of silence, translators of various stations originating from Green Bay, and a handful of encrypted cable channels broadcast over the air.

Radio

Radio stations that are located within listening range of Iron Mountain include:
WNMU-FM   90.1 FM 	Northern Michigan University Marquette, National Public Radio
WMVM-FM   90.7 FM 	Goodman-Armstrong Creek, Wisconsin, Gospel
WVCM   91.5 FM 	VCY America 	Iron Mountain, Religious
WIMK   93.1 FM 	Iron Mountain, 	Classic Rock
WZNL   94.3 FM 	Norway, 	Adult Contemporary
WEUL   98.1 FM 	Gospel Opportunities Radio Network Kingsford, 	Religious
WIKB-FM   99.1 FM 	Iron River, 	Oldies
WOBE   100.7 FM 	Crystal Falls,	Top 40/CHR 	
WJNR-FM   101.5 FM 	Iron Mountain, 	Frog Country
WGMV   106.3 FM 	Stephenson, 	Classic Country
WHTO   106.7 FM 	Iron Mountain, 	80's Rock
WFER   1230 AM 	Iron River, 	Oldies
WMIQ   1450 AM 	Iron Mountain, 	Talk

Environmental importance

Iron Mountain's abandoned Millie Hill mine is home to one of the largest bat hibernacula in the Midwest. Roughly 25,000-50,000 bats make their winter home there.

Menominee Range

Iron Mountain is located within the Menominee Iron-Bearing District, which covers southern Dickinson County and extends westward into Iron County. Iron ore was discovered in Dickinson County in 1849 and Iron County in 1851. Ore is produced from the middle Precambrian Vulcan Iron-Formation around Iron Mountain, and the Riverton Iron-Formation between Iron River, Michigan and Crystal Falls, Michigan. Both formations belong to the Marquette Range Supergroup. The Vulcan is between 300 and 800 feet thick and consists of hematite and magnetite with quartz, while the Riverton is 100–600 feet thick and consists of siderite and chert.

Historical importance
Iron Mountain began as a mining city adjacent to the Chapin iron mine. The Chapin Mine iron deposit was discovered in 1879 by two men, James John Hagerman and Dr. Nelson Powell Hulst. They had leased the land from a man from Niles, Michigan, Henry Chapin, hence the name of the mine. They began to sink shafts on the slope of Millie Hill. Then on July 5, 1879, Captain John Wicks and seven other men were sent into the forest with a wagon filled with tools to search for a place to set up camp. After numerous unsuccessful shafts the company was ready to shut down operation. Hagerman and Hulst had faith in the land and tried one more shaft. The original land was very swampy and filled with trees. To get rid of all this water the Chapin Mine Pumping Engine was created.

Iron Mountain is home of the largest steam-driven pumping engine in the United States. Chapin Mine Steam Pump Engine (Cornish Pump) was patterned after the ones used in Cornwall in the deep tin mines.

Edwin Reynolds, chief engineer for the E.P. Allis Company (now the Allis-Chalmers Co.) of Milwaukee, Wisconsin, designed the steam engine in 1890. The designers estimate the weight to be 725 tons over all.

The pumping equipment utilized a reciprocating motion to a line of steel rods extending  down into the mine, with eight pumps attached at intervals of 170 to  along the rods. Each of the pumps forced the water to the next higher pump and finally out to the surface of the mine.

As the engine was designed to run slowly, the pumps had a capacity of over 300 gallons per stroke of the pistons. At ten revolutions per minute, this meant over 3,000 gallons of water poured out through a  pipe every minute. A total of 5,000,000 gallons of water could be removed from the mine each day. At that time the pump's estimated cost was nearly $250,000.

After only a few years of successful operation, the giant pumping facility was moved from the "D" shaft of the Chapin Mine. More than a million tons of the best grade ore found in the entire mine was discovered directly below the pump, so it was essential that it be moved for excavation. In 1898 the pump was dismantled and stored away until 1907 when it was reassembled on the "C" shaft of the Chapin Mine. The pump operated here until 1932 when the Chapin Mine permanently closed its doors. In 1934 the pumping engine was offered to the County of Dickinson as a relic for sightseers to visit. The pump remained exposed to the elements for nearly 50 years, and in 1982 a building was constructed around the pump by the Menominee Range Historical Foundation. Today the Cornish Pumping Engine & Mining Museum exists on the site.

The Chapin Mine Pumping Engine (Cornish Pump) was designated as a National Historic Mechanical Engineering Monument by the American Society of Mechanical Engineers on June 6, 1987 and has been featured in the History Channel's Modern Marvels Series on the World's Biggest Machines.

Notable people
James L. Adams, member of the Minnesota House of Representatives
Randy Awrey, 1975 DII National Champion football player at Northern Michigan University and current head football coach at Concordia University Chicago
John Biolo, former NFL player for the Green Bay Packers
Neno DaPrato, college All-American and professional football player
Robert J. Flaherty, filmmaker
Walter Samuel Goodland, 31st governor of Wisconsin
R. James Harvey, former congressman and federal judge
Tom Izzo, men's basketball head coach for Michigan State University since 1995
Johnny Johnson, baseball player
Beau LaFave, member of the Michigan House of Representatives
Gordon Lund, baseball player
Steve Mariucci, NFL Network analyst and former NFL head coach
Thomas Lawrence Noa, Roman Catholic bishop
Phillip Rahoi, member of the Michigan Legislature and mayor of Iron Mountain
Gene Ronzani, former NFL head coach of the Green Bay Packers
Albert J. Wilke, member of the Michigan Senate
Delaney Schnell, American Olympic diver.

Climate
This climatic region is typified by large seasonal temperature differences, with warm to hot (and often humid) summers and cold (sometimes severely cold) winters. According to the Köppen Climate Classification system, Iron Mountain has a humid continental climate, abbreviated "Dfb" on climate maps.

References

External links 
 City of Iron Mountain
 Iron Mountain and the Dickinson County Area
 

 

Cities in Dickinson County, Michigan
Cornish-American culture in Michigan
County seats in Michigan
Iron Mountain micropolitan area
Populated places established in 1879